Goygol, Göygöl, or Goygöl may refer to:

Places in Azerbaijan
 Goygol District
 Goygol (city)
 Göygöl (lake)
 Göygöl National Park

Other uses
 "Goygol", a poem by AzerbaijanI poet Ahmad Javad